Urodexia is a genus of flies in the family Tachinidae.

Species
Urodexia penicillum Osten Sacken, 1882
Urodexia uramyoides (Townsend, 1927)

References

Exoristinae
Diptera of Asia
Taxa named by Carl Robert Osten-Sacken
Tachinidae genera